The Hawaiian language has offered a number of words to the English language. Some Hawaiian words are known to non-Hawaiian speakers, and a few have also been assimilated into the English language (e.g. aloha, meaning "hello", "love", or "goodbye", or mahalo, meaning "thank you"). English also borrows some Hawaiian words (e.g. ukulele, mahimahi, and muʻumuʻu). Hawaiian vocabulary often overlaps with other Polynesian languages, such as Tahitian, so it is not always clear which of those languages a term is borrowed from.

The Hawaiian orthography is notably different from the English orthography because there is a special letter in the Hawaiian alphabet, the ʻokina. The ʻokina represents a glottal stop, which indicates a short pause to separate syllables. The kahakō represents longer vowel sounds. Both the okina and kahakō are often omitted in English orthography.

Due to the Hawaiian orthography's difference from English orthography, the pronunciation of the words differ. For example, the muʻumuʻu, traditionally a Hawaiian dress, is pronounced   by many mainland (colloquial term for the Continental U.S.) residents. However, many Hawaii residents have learned that the ʻokina in Hawaiian signifies a glottal stop. The pronunciations listed here are how it would sound in Hawaiian orthography.

See also 

 Lists of English words of international origin
 List of English words of Polynesian origin

References

English
Hawaiian
Hawaii culture